The 1987 IIHF European U18 Championship was the twentieth playing of the IIHF European Junior Championships.

Group A
Played April 3–12, 1987, in Tampere, Kouvola, and Hämeenlinna, Finland.  Sweden, Czechoslovakia, and the Soviet Union, finished tied atop the standings after seven games.  Amongst the three, Sweden had the better goal differential in their head to head games, so they won the gold. The Czech's and Soviets still remained even, so the silver medal was awarded based on goals scored in the head to head games: six to four in favor of Czechoslovakia.

West Germany was relegated to Group B for 1988.

Tournament Awards
Top Scorer  Roman Horák (15 points)
Top Goalie: Tommy Söderström
Top Defenceman:Alexander Godynyuk
Top Forward: Roman Horák

Group B
Played April 3–9, 1987, in Bucharest, Romania

First round
Group 1

Bulgaria would have been second in their group but they were disqualified for falsifying birthdates for some of their players.  Their games did not count in the standings and they received no official ranking.
Group 2

Final round
Championship round

Placing round

Romania was promoted to Group A and Bulgaria was relegated to Group C, for 1988.

Group C
Played March 14–19, 1987, in Zoetermeer, the Netherlands.

The Netherlands was promoted to Group B for 1988.

References

Complete results

1986–87 in European ice hockey
1987
April 1987 sports events in Europe
International ice hockey competitions hosted by Finland
Sport in Hämeenlinna
Kouvola
Sports competitions in Tampere
1986–87 in Finnish ice hockey
Sports competitions in Bucharest
1980s in Bucharest
International ice hockey competitions hosted by Romania
1986–87 in Romanian ice hockey
1986–87 in Dutch ice hockey
International ice hockey competitions hosted by the Netherlands
March 1987 sports events in Europe
1987 IIHF European U18 Championship
1987 IIHF European U18 Championship